Microsoft Loop is an online collaboration platform that Microsoft is developing. Loop was officially announced on 2 November 2021 as part of Microsoft's latest Microsoft 365 app.

According to The Verge, Loop provides "blocks of collaborative text or content that can live independently and be copied, pasted, and shared freely."

References

External links 
 

Microsoft Office